39 East is a 1920 American silent comedy film produced by the Realart Picture Company (headed by Paramount Pictures's Adolph Zukor), and starring Constance Binney reprising her role from the Broadway play. The film was directed by John S. Robertson.

The film is based on the play of the same name by Rachel Crothers, which was a hit on Broadway with Binney starring.

Plot
As described in a film magazine, Penelope Penn (Binney), to financially aid others of the poor minister's family to which she belongs, goes to New York City and becomes one of the boardinghouse colony at "39 East." The identity of her business she keeps a mystery, thereby arousing the unsympathetic speculations of her fellow female boarders. She finds a champion and lover in Napoleon Gibbs Jr. (Denny), a young wealthy aristocrat, who helps her over many a rough spot during her boardinghouse life. Her chance to shine histrionically comes when there is a sudden refusal of the theater star, to whom she understudies, to go on while she is in the chorus. Penelope's success assures her family's future and brings the climax of her romance, which promises a "happy ever after" ending.

Cast
Constance Binney as Penelope Penn
Reginald Denny as Napoleon Gibbs Jr.
Alison Skipworth as Mrs. de Mailly
Lucia Moore as Mrs. Smith
Blanche Frederici as Miss McMasters
Edith Gresham as Sadie Clarence
Mildred Arden as Myrtle Clarence
Luis Alberni as Count Gionelli
Albert Carroll as Dr. Hubbard
Frank Allworth as Timothy O'Brien

References

External links

Still of Constance Binney and Reginald Denny from 39 East (University of Washington, Sayre Collection)

1920 films
1920 comedy films
Silent American comedy films
American silent feature films
American black-and-white films
American films based on plays
Films directed by John S. Robertson
1920s American films